Robert Lees (1912–2004) was an American screenwriter.

Robert Lees may also refer to:
 Robert Lees (baseball) (born 1959), American Korea Baseball Organization infielder
 Robert Lees (linguist) (1922–1996), American linguist
 Robert James Lees (1849–1931), British spiritualist
 Robert Lees (politician) (1842–1908), Wisconsin politician

See also 
 Robert Lee (disambiguation)